The Third Nehru ministry was formed on 17 April 1957 after the Indian National Congress won the 1957 general election with a vast majority.

Ministry
Key
  Died in office
  Resigned

Cabinet ministers

|}

Ministers of State

|}

References

Indian union ministries
1957 establishments in India
Nehru administration
Cabinets established in 1962
1962 disestablishments in India
Cabinets disestablished in 1962